Guinness Ghana Breweries is a Ghanaian brewery founded in 1960. It is located at the Kaase Industrial Area in Kumasi.

Guinness Ghana Breweries is listed on the stock index of the Ghana Stock Exchange, the GSE All-Share Index.  At its inception, the company produced only Guinness Foreign Extra Stout, popularly known as Guinness. The primary depot was at the same position with stores across the country particularly in the south.

In Accra, they are at the former premise of Achimota Brewery Company in Achimota, which is actually the Tata Brewery Ltd established by iconic, indigenous Ghanaian industrialist J. K. Siaw.

Brands 
The company makes the following products:
 Malta Guinness
 Star Beer 
 Orijin 
 Smirnoff 
 Alvaro
 Gulder
 Guinness
 Odehye3

Sponsorship 
On 5 August 2022, the Ghana Football Association announced a title sponsorship with Malta Guinness for the Ghana Women’s Premier League worth GH¢10 million (renaming the league as the Malta Guinness Women's Premier League) for three years from the 2022–23 season onwards.

External links
Guinness Ghana Breweries at African-select
Guinness Ghana Breweries at Alacrastore 
Guinness Ghana Breweries

References

Food and drink companies of Ghana
Breweries of Africa
Diageo
Food and drink companies established in 1991
Ghanaian companies established in 1991
Companies listed on the Ghana Stock Exchange
Manufacturing companies based in Accra
Kumasi
Buildings and structures in Kumasi
Alcohol in Ghana